Yemen competed at the 2008 Summer Olympics in Beijing, China.

Athletics

Neither Yemeni runner managed to qualify out of their opening heats, though Waseelah Saad set a new national record in the women's 100 metres.

Men

Women

Gymnastics

Artistic
Nashwan Al-Harazi completed routines on three of the six apparatus, with his best showing on vault, where he was 60th with his first attempt. He did attempt to qualify for the vault final by taking a second attempt, but ended up in last place in the 2-vault standings.

Men

Judo

Yemen's lone judoka in Beijing lost his first round match and was eliminated.

Swimming

The only swimmer representing Yemen in Beijing failed to advance from the heats.

Men

References

Official 2008 Summer Olympics Results Website

Nations at the 2008 Summer Olympics
2008
Olympics